Lara Gillespie (born 21 April 2001) is an Irish professional racing cyclist, who currently rides for UCI Women's Continental Team . At the 2019 UCI Junior Track Cycling World Championships, Gillespie won a bronze medal in the individual pursuit. She rode in the women's team pursuit event at the 2020 UCI Track Cycling World Championships in Berlin, Germany.

Major results

Track

2018
UEC European Junior Track Championships
1st  Points Race
2nd Individual Pursuit
National Junior Track Championships
1st  500m Time Trial
1st  Individual Pursuit
1st  Scratch Race
1st  Individual Sprint

2019
National Junior Track Championships
1st  Individual Pursuit
1st  Scratch Race
1st  Individual Sprint
2nd 500m Time Trial
UEC European Junior Track Championships
2nd Points Race
2nd Scratch Race
2nd Individual Pursuit
UCI Track Cycling Junior World Championships
3rd Individual Pursuit

2020
National Track Championships
1st  Scratch Race
2nd Individual Pursuit
3rd Individual Sprint

Cyclo-cross
2017
1st  Debutants, National Cyclo-cross Championships

2018
1st  National Cyclo-cross Championships
2nd Belfast Cyclo-cross

2019
1st  National Cyclo-cross Championships

Road
2018
1st  Road Race, National Junior Road Championships

2019 
2nd Road Race, National Junior Road Championships

2020 
1st  Road Race, National Road Championships

References

External links
 

2001 births
Living people
Irish female cyclists
Place of birth missing (living people)
Tennis players from Dublin (city)